Friendship Circle is a collaborative art installation by American artist Lee Kelly and musician Michael Stirling, located in Portland, Oregon's Tom McCall Waterfront Park, in the United States. The installation features a stainless steel sculpture with two 20-foot towers, designed by Kelly, and a 35-minute score composed by Stirling. It celebrates the sister city relationship between Portland and Sapporo, Japan.

Description and history
Friendship Circle was commissioned and installed in 1990. According to the Regional Arts & Culture Council, which administers the work, the sculpture's two structures measure  ×  and  × , respectively.

See also

 1990 in art

References

External links
 

1990 establishments in Oregon
1990 sculptures
Collaborative projects
Japanese-American culture in Portland, Oregon
Northwest Portland, Oregon
Old Town Chinatown
Outdoor sculptures in Portland, Oregon
Sculptures by Lee Kelly
Sound sculptures
Stainless steel sculptures in Oregon
Tom McCall Waterfront Park